Eric C. Burton, best known by the recording alias Rabit, is an American producer of experimental electronic music, as well as the owner of his own label Halcyon Veil, born in Houston.

Career
Burton began his musical career making experimental grime music for online record labels. Eventually, he released his debut album Communion on Tri Angle, which was released to critical acclaim. In a Pitchfork review by Philip Sherburne, where he rated the record 7.9 out of 10, he stated that it was 'violent music' and that 'you emerge even after just a few minutes' worth of the album's unrelenting barrage of beats and palette of sampled shrapnel feeling dazed and punch-drunk'.

In 2017, Burton was featured as a producer on Björk's Grammy-nominated album Utopia for the track 'Losss'. In the same year, he released Les Fleurs Du Mal, a shift in style to pure experimental electronic music outside of grime. He currently owns and releases music on the record label Halcyon Veil, which has existed since 2015.

Burton has also produced and independently released mixtapes of chopped and screwed music in the vein of DJ Screw.

Discography
Studio albums
 Communion (2015, Tri Angle)
 Les Fleurs Du Mal (2017, Halcyon Veil)
 Life After Death (2018, Halcyon Veil)
 What Dreams May Come (2022, Halcyon Veil)

EPs
 Terminator (2012, #FEELINGS)
 Double Dragon (2013, Glacial Sound)
 Baptizm (2015, Tri Angle)
 Toe In The Bardo Pond (2018, Halcyon Veil)

Mixtapes
 Cry Alone Die Alone (2018, Halcyon Veil)
 Bricks in a Drought (2018)
 The Dope Show (2019, Halcyon Veil)
 Kold Summer (2019)
Star Belly (2019)

References

Ambient musicians
American electronic musicians
American experimental musicians
Industrial musicians
Grime music artists
American hip hop DJs
Musicians from Houston
Living people
Year of birth missing (living people)